Navi is a Trinidadian-born Michael Jackson tribute artist and actor based in England.

Navi starred as Jackson in Michael Jackson: Searching for Neverland, a 2017 American television biopic.

Career
His career during the life of the late pop superstar has seen him working for Michael Jackson as a decoy, and for the promotion of world tours and albums such as HIStory: Past, Present and Future, Book I, Invincible and Thriller 25.

2009
In 2009, following the death of Michael Jackson, Navi was invited to attend the UK premiere of Michael Jackson's This Is It in London's Leicester Square.

2016
In 2016, for his The Legend Continues tour, Navi was joined on stage by Jennifer Batten. Batten was lead guitarist for Michael Jackson on three world tours, including the Bad Tour, the Dangerous World Tour and the HIStory World Tour, as well as the Super Bowl XXVII halftime show.

Acting debut
In late 2016, Navi was cast in the starring role of Michael Jackson in the Lifetime/Silver Screen Pictures film, Michael Jackson: Searching for Neverland, his acting debut. The biopic was executive produced by Suzanne de Passe, former President of Motown Productions. Shooting began in January 2017 on location in Los Angeles.

References

External links 
 
 
 Navi's UK tour website

Living people
Michael Jackson impersonators
Cultural depictions of Michael Jackson
Trinidad and Tobago emigrants to the United Kingdom
1972 births